Heggs Lake is a natural lake in South Dakota, in the United States.

Heggs Lake has the name of Ole Hegg, a pioneer who settled there.

See also
List of lakes in South Dakota

References

Lakes of South Dakota
Lakes of Clark County, South Dakota